Liliput may refer to:

 LiLiPUT, a Swiss band
 Liliput pistol, a tiny 4.25 mm pistol or its 4.25mm Liliput cartridge
 Prater Liliputbahn, a 381 mm gauge railway in the park Prater in Vienna

See also
Lilliput (disambiguation)

fr:Lilliput
ru:Лилипут